Anepholcia talboti is a moth in the family Noctuidae. It is found on Sumatra.

References

Moths described in 1924
Pantheinae